The women's individual épée competition at the 2014 Asian Games in Goyang was held on 22 September at the Goyang Gymnasium.

Schedule
All times are Korea Standard Time (UTC+09:00)

Results

Preliminaries

Pool A

Pool B

Pool C

Pool D

Summary

Knockout round

Final

Top half

Bottom half

Final standing

References
Women's Individual Epée Results

External links
Official website

Women Epee